The 1968 All-Ireland Senior Camogie Championship for the leading clubs in the women's team field sport of camogie was won by St Paul’s (Kk, who beatAhane (Lk) in the final, played at St John’s Park.

Arrangements
The championship was organised on the traditional provincial system used in Gaelic Games since the 1880s, with Deirdre and Ballinasloe winning the championships of the other two provinces.

The Final
St Paul’s had the final won at half time when they led by 5-1 to 0-1. Anne Carroll scored 4-1 of their total and M Cassin 3-1. Carrie Clancy, their outstanding player, scored a second half goal from a thirty.
 Agnes Hourigan wrote in the Irish Press: The winners were the more experienced side, showing fine combination, perfect positional sense, better ball control and were much better strikers. The visitors, while they had some fine individual players and a fine goalkeeper, lacked teamwork and were too slow to get rid of the ball.

Provincial stages

Final stages

References

External links
 Camogie Association

1968 in camogie
1968